Baden District may refer to:
 Baden District, Austria, a district  of the state  of Lower Austria in Austria
 Baden District, Aargau, a district in the canton of Aargau, Switzerland

See also
Baden (disambiguation)

District name disambiguation pages